House of Guled was the ruling house of the Isaaq Sultanate from 1750 to 1884 and is also a subclan in its own right. The family are descendants of the Eidagale sub division of the wider Garhajis and in extension Isaaq clan-family. Although they no longer hold any authority, they are the royal house of Somaliland and are viewed as a favoured symbol in the country. In July 2021, Sultan Mahamed Abdiqadir had a state funeral with nationwide media coverage and was attended by high government officials, including the president of Somaliland; Muse Bihi Abdi and foreign dignitaries.

Origin 

The Guled dynasty was established in the middle of the 18th century by Sultan Guled of the Eidagale line of the Garhajis clan. His coronation took place after the victorious battle of Lafaruug in which his father, a religious mullah Abdi Eisa successfully led the Isaaq in battle and defeated the Absame tribes near Berbera where a century earlier the Isaaq clan expanded into. After witnessing his leadership and courage, the Isaaq chiefs recognized his father Abdi who refused the position instead relegating the title to his underage son Guled while the father acted as the regent till the son come of age. Guled was crowned as the first Sultan of the Isaaq clan in July 1750. Sultan Guled thus ruled the Isaaq up until his death in 1808, where he was succeeded by his eldest son Farah full brother of Yuusuf and Du'ale, all from Guled's fourth wife Ambaro Me'ad Gadid.

List of Sultans

Sultan Guled Family tree 
Farah Sultan Guled-Prince

Jama Sultan Guled-Prince

Du,ale Sultan Guled-Prince

Roble Sultan Guled-Prince

Dirie Sultan Guled-Prince

Gaataa Sultan Guled-Prince

Egal Sultan Guled-Prince

Abdi Sultan Guled-Prince

Ali Sultan Guled-Prince

Editing:Member of Suldan Guled Family Named Abdikadir Vaisal.

References 
{Member of Guled Suldan family named Abdikadir Vaisal}Sons Of Sultan Guled.

Isaaq Sultanate
Former empires
Former countries in Africa
Somali empires
States and territories established in 1750
Early Modern history of Somaliland
Modern history of Somaliland
Dynasties
African royal families
Somaliland noble families
States and territories disestablished in the 19th century
States and territories disestablished in the 1880s
Former countries